The Cook Islands national beach soccer team represents the Cook Islands in international beach soccer competitions and is controlled by the Cook Islands Football Association, the governing body for football in the Cook Islands.

To date, the Cook Islands have competed just once in Oceania's major beach soccer championship, the OFC Beach Soccer Championship, in 2006.

Achievements
OFC Beach Soccer Championship Best: 4th place
2006

Current squad
Correct as of September 2006.

References

Oceanian national beach soccer teams
Beach Soccer